Dipak is a given name. Notable people with the name include:

Dipak Prakash Baskota, Nepalese politician
Dipak Chudasama (born 1963), former Kenyan cricketer
Dipak K. Das (1947–2013), the director of the Cardiovascular Research Center at the University of Connecticut Health Center in Farmington
Dipak Desai, majority owner of Endoscopy Center of Southern Nevada, a private same day surgery facility localed in Las Vegas, Nevada
Dipak C. Jain, the Director (Dean) of Sasin Graduate Institute of Business Administration of Chulalongkorn University in Bangkok, Thailand
Dipak Kalra (born 1959 in London), President of the European Institute for Health Records and of the European Institute for Innovation through Health Data
Dipak Karki, Nepalese politician, belonging to the Communist Party of Nepal (UML)
Dipak Misra (born 1953), judge of the Supreme Court of India
Dipak Nandy, Indian Marxist and academic who was the founder and first Director of the Runnymede Trust
Dipak Patel (cricketer, born 1958) (born 1958), played 37 Tests and 75 One Day Internationals for the New Zealand cricket team
Dipak Patel (cricketer, born 1961) (born 1961), former Kenyan cricketer
Dipak Rai, Nepali footballer
Dipak Sarma, flautist from the Assam state of India
Dipak Tijori (born 1961), Indian film director and actor who works in Bollywood films

See also
Deepak, also a given name
DIPA (disambiguation)
Ipak (disambiguation)